The Musić (Musići / Мусићи) was a Serbian noble house that served the Serbian Empire (1345–1371), and during its fall (1371–1389) it served Tsar Lazar's Serbia. The eponymous founder was čelnik Musa, who married Dragana Hrebeljanović, the sister of Tsar Lazar (r. 1371-1389). Stefan and Lazar Musić, the sons of Musa, held a region of roughly modern Raška municipality and north Kosovo. The brothers died fighting the Ottoman Empire in the Battle of Kosovo (1389).

History
 
They held a region of north Kosovo, around Ibar with the seat in Zvečan. Musa was given the estate by Emperor Stefan Uroš V (r. 1355-1371). They relocated their seat to Brvenik on the Ibar, due to the swapping of fortified cities with Vojislav Vojinović (around 1355-1363). Their province included the Kopaonik area (with mines), in the middle of the Ibar and Lab, and stretched from the Radočelo and Brvenička župa in the northwest, to the Brvenica tributary of Lab in the southeast.

They supported the politics of Prince Lazar Hrebeljanović (r. 1371–89), and participated in the war against veliki župan Nikola Altomanović (1366–73), whom Stefan Musić directly ordered to be blinded in Užice, and thus left the political war during the fall of the Empire. 

The Musić brothers founded the Nova Pavlica monastery, built after the Stara Pavlica, near Brvenik (Ibar). The ktitor inscription is preserved. At the request of their mother Dragana, the sister of Lazar Hrebeljanović, the monastery became a nunnery, in which Dragana spent the end of her life as nun. The two Musić brothers fell in the Battle of Kosovo (1389), and were buried in Nova Pavlica.

Members
Musa, čelnik under Emperor Stephen Uroš V (1355–1371)
Stefan Musić (d. 1389)
Lazar Musić (d. 1389)
Jovan Musić

References

Sources
 Mihaljčić, Rade,  Kraj srpskog carstva, Beograd, 1975. (str. 216)
 Fajfric, Sveta loza Stefana Nemanje, chapter X
 The Late Medieval Balkans: A Critical Survey from the Late Twelfth Century to the Ottoman Conquest, John Van Antwerp Fine, 1987
 Ј. Деретић, Српска народна епика, Београд 2000.
 Ј. Деретић, Историја српске књижевности, Београд 2002.
 Р. Михаљчић, Јунаци косовске легенде, Београд 2001.
 М. Шуица, Немирно доба српског Средњег века, Властела српских обласних господара, Београд 2000.
 Istorijska Biblioteka: Stefan Musić

14th-century Serbian nobility
People of the Serbian Empire
Serbian noble families
Kosovo Serbs